AMSA or Amsa may refer to: 

 Amsa-dong, a neighbourhood in Seoul, South Korea
 Amsa station, a subway station in Seoul, South Korea
 Advanced Manned Strategic Aircraft, project name for the Rockwell B-1 Lancer
 Advanced Math and Science Academy Charter School, a public charter school in Marlboro, Massachusetts
 American Medical Student Association
 American Moving & Storage Association
 Association of Marist Schools of Australia
 Australian Maritime Safety Authority
 Australian Medical Students' Association
 Aerolineas Mundo S.A.-AMSA, a defunct Dominican airline